In 2019, Wales generated 27% of its electricity consumption as renewable electricity, an increase from 19% in 2014. The Welsh Government set a target of 70% by 2030. In 2019, Wales was a net exporter of electricity. It produced 27.9 TWh of electricity while only consuming 14.7 TWh. The natural resource base for renewable energy is high by European standards, with the core sources being wind, wave, and tidal. Wales has a long history of renewable energy: in the 1880s, the first house in Wales with electric lighting powered from its own hydro-electric power station was in Plas Tan y Bwlch, Gwynedd. In 1963, the Ffestiniog Power Station was constructed, providing a large scale generation of hydroelectricity, and in November 1973, the Centre for Alternative Technology was opened in Machynlleth.

Government policy
In April 2019, a Climate Emergency was declared by the Welsh Government, and on 1 May the Senedd became the first parliament in the world to pass a climate emergency declaration.

Current Welsh Government policy advocates for an increase in the percentage that renewable energy accounts for in Wales' energy sector, launching projects such as 'Prosperity for All: A Low Carbon Wales' to achieve this goal. 'The Climate Change Strategy for Wales' describes how the government will decrease greenhouse gas emissions. The reports suggest that energy generation from renewable sources is key to achieving a low carbon economy.

The Welsh Government expects that all new energy projects should have an element of local ownership and this was the case for 825 MW of installed renewable energy capacity in 2019.

In 2016, the low carbon economy was estimated to consist of 9,000 businesses, employing 13,000 people and generating a £2.4 billion turnover.

By principal area

Percentage of electricity consumption which from local renewables in 2019 (5 highest):

 Ceredigion: 110%
 Denbighshire: 100%
 Powys: 91%
 Rhondda Cynon Taf: 66%
 Neath Port Talbot: 65%

Hydropower

List of hydropower stations 

List of active hydropower stations in order of energy output:

In 2019, there were 363 hydroelectric projects in Wales, with the capacity of 182MW, annually generating over 347 GWh. Since 2014 Natural Resources Wales (NRW) have enabled developers and small community groups to build 15 small scale hydro schemes in Wales, which can produce 1300kW of energy annually. NRW have also finished building the 17kW Garwnant small scale hydro scheme in 2017.

Dinorwig Power Station, which lies on the boundary of the Snowdonia National Park, was fully commissioned in 1984. It has six generators placed inside Europe's largest man-made cavern, deep inside the Elidir mountain. Maximum electricity generation is achieved in less than 16 seconds, and is the largest quick response hydropower plant in Europe.

The Rheidol hydropower plant is the largest hydropowerplant of its kind in Wales. It has generated renewable energy since 1962, using rainfall from the nearby mountains. The plant includes a combination of reservoirs, dams, pipelines, aqueducts and power stations, over 162 square kilometres producing around 85 GWh annually which can power around 12,350 homes. The Ffestiniog power station opened in Gwynedd in 1963 and produces 360 MW.

Tidal power
Wales has a vast untapped potential for tidal poser. Gerallt Llewelyn Jones of social enterprise Menter Môn said,: “We have strong tidal resources around Wales and they have huge potential.” he added that tidal power is more predictable than wind and solar power.  The tidal range round the west coast of Britain is one of the largest in the world.

Swansea tidal lagoon 

In 2015 the idea was raised the UK government to fund a £1 billion development of a sea wall around Swansea Bay to harness the power of the tide. The power generated could provide energy for 120,000 homes for 120  years. Other sites mooted were Cardiff Bay, Newport and Colwyn Bay. In June 2018 the UK government abandoned their support for the scheme, saying other forms of energy generation were cheaper. The decision was condemned by the green energy industry, environmental groups, the Labour Party and Plaid Cymru.

In January 2023, plans of a new Swansea tidal lagoon project called "Blue Eden" emerged but this time the multi-billion pound project would be fully funded by the private sector. Phase SA1 of the project is said to include an electric battery manufacturing plant, battery storage facility, a tidal lagoon in Swansea Bay with a floating solar farm, data storage centre, a green hydrogen production facility, an oceanic and climate change research centre, and hundreds of waterfront homes. Claimed it would be a worldwide first, the project could start within 18 months but would take more than a decade to complete.

Morlais tidal stream 
The Morlais project is to build lagoons with large sea walls and turbines powered by rising and falling tides, it could power 180,000 homes. The proposed North Wales Tidal Lagoon would involve a sea wall over 19 miles long from Llandudno to Prestatyn. Supporters say the £7bn project could power more thanover a million homes and create more thn 20,000 jobs.

The Morlais tidal stream project is set to cover 35km2 of the Irish Sea on the west coast of Anglesey/Ynys Môn. It is hoped that investors and developers will build early-scale tidal energy projects which could deliver a combined 40MW of renewable clean energy. In 2022, £31million was secured for the first phase of construction from the EU's European Regional Development fund via the Welsh Government, which is likely to be the last large grant Wales receives from the EU. Jones Bros Civil Engineering has been given a £23.5m contract to build onshore infrastructure and Magallanes Tidal Energy has secured a guaranteed price for the energy it produces. The Government has agreed a £178.54 per MWh price via the Contracts for Difference (CfD) scheme.

Wind power

Offshore wind

In 2021, three offshore wind farms off the north coast had a capacity of 726 MW: Rhyl Flats and North Hoyle have a capacity of 150 MW, and Gwynt y Môr was commissioned in 2015 and in 2019 had a capacity of 576 MW with 160 turbines, making it the fifth largest operating offshore windfarm in the world.

Blue Gem Wind, a joint venture between TotalEnergies and Simply Blue Energy, is a Celtic Sea project developer that has secured rights to develop Wales’ first floating offshore wind farm, located 45 km south of the Pembrokeshire Coast. This will be Wales' first floating wind farm and could start generating electricity by 2027.

Onshore wind
One of the main problems facing developers in Wales are peat bogs, a naturally-occurring carbon sink. Ornithological issues, especially in ecologically rich sites can also increase developing costs. Some of the main terrestrial wind energy farms include:
 Brechfa Forest West (up to 28 turbines, 57.4MW) - ‘Renewable Energy Project of the Year’ winner
 Clocaenog Forest, Denbighshire (27 turbines, 96MW),  
 Llandinam Windfarm, Powys (103 turbines, 31MW) - the oldest ScottishPower Renewables' windfarm, operated as CeltPower Ltd. Constructed in 1992.
 Pen y Cymoedd (76 turbine, 228MW) - Wales's largest onshore wind farm;  a battery storage scheme will also be built onsite.

In 2019, the capacity was 1.25 GW, according to the Welsh Government, which was an increase of 12% from the previous year. Neath Port Talbot, with its 230 MW capacity in 2019 was the highest in Wales. Onshore wind is relatively strong in Wales, due to its mountainous and coastal nature.

Solar PV

Solar PV (for electricity) and thermal panels (for hot water) are used throughout the country, for both domestic and non-domestic use. From 2012, roof-mounted solar panels 
above 50 kW needed full planning permission; anything below that fell under 'permitted rights'.

Nearly 20% of Wales' total solar power (989 MW) is generated in Pembrokeshire. In 2019, 26% of the national, total capacity solar PV in Wales was locally owned.

Welsh ministers have approved a 32MW solar farm project near Abergavenny and construction is expected to start in 2024.

Heat pumps
In 2019, the total capacity from water, air and ground source heat pumps totalled 86 MW, from 7,817 projects. Most of these were domestic installations, and around 80% were air source heat pumps.

See also

National

 Energy in Wales
 Sophie Howe

Global

 Renewable energy in Scotland
 World energy consumption
 List of energy storage projects
 List of renewable energy topics by country
 Renewable energy development
 Hydrogen economy
 Renewable energy by country

External links
 The Welsh Government's commissioned surveys and assessments of renewable energy installations in Wales. Currently available:
 2019
 2018
 2017
 2016
 2015
 Blue Gem Wind

References

 
Electricity policy in Wales
Climate change in Wales
Sustainability in Wales